The 1958 Women's European Volleyball Championship was the fifth edition of the event, organised by Europe's governing volleyball body, the Confédération Européenne de Volleyball. It was hosted in Czechoslovakia from 30 August to 10 September 1958.

Participating teams

Format
The tournament was played in two different stages. In the first stage, the twelve participants were divided into four groups of three teams. In the second stage, two groups were formed, one containing the winners and runners-up from all first stage groups (eight teams in total) to contest the tournament title. A second group was formed by the last placed teams of first stage groups (four teams) which played for position places (9th to 12th). All groups in both stages played a single round-robin format.

Pools composition

Squads

Venues

Preliminary round

Pool A
venue location: Prague, Czechoslovakia

|}

|}

Pool B
venue location: České Budějovice, Czechoslovakia

|}

|}

Pool C
venue location: Prague, Czechoslovakia

|}

|}

Pool D
venue location: Liberec, Czechoslovakia

|}

|}

Final round
venue location: Prague, Czechoslovakia

9th–12th pool

|}

|}

Final pool

|}

|}

Final ranking

References
 Confédération Européenne de Volleyball (CEV)

External links
 Results at todor66.com

European Volleyball Championships
Volleyball Championship
V
Women's European Volleyball Championships
Women's European Volleyball Championship, 1058
Women's European Volleyball Championship
Women's European Volleyball Championship
Women's volleyball in Czechoslovakia
Sports competitions in Prague